Tanguy Sie Herman Barro (born 13 September 1982) is a Burkinabé former professional footballer who played as a midfielder for the French clubs Chamois Niortais, Besançon RC, Cognac, and Stade Ruffec as well as for the Belgian teams Racing Waregem and K.A.S. Eupen.

He was a member of the Burkina Faso national team at the 2004 African Nations Cup, which finished bottom of their group in the first round of competition, thus failing to secure qualification for the quarter-finals. Barro played 24 matches for Burkina Faso in total.

External links
 

1982 births
Living people
People from Hauts-Bassins Region
Burkinabé footballers
Association football midfielders
Burkina Faso international footballers
Ligue 2 players
Challenger Pro League players
RC Bobo Dioulasso players
Racing Besançon players
Chamois Niortais F.C. players
K.A.S. Eupen players
UA Cognac players
2002 African Cup of Nations players
2004 African Cup of Nations players
Burkinabé expatriate footballers
Burkinabé expatriate sportspeople in France
Expatriate footballers in France
Burkinabé expatriate sportspeople in Belgium
Expatriate footballers in Belgium
21st-century Burkinabé people